The 2017 Apia International Sydney was a joint 2017 ATP World Tour and 2017 WTA Tour tennis tournament, played on outdoor hard courts in Sydney, New South Wales (NSW). It was the 124th edition of the tournament and took place at the NSW Tennis Centre in Sydney, Australia. It was held from 8 January through 14 January 2017 as part of the Australian Open Series in preparation for the first Grand Slam of the year.

The women's main-draw ranking cut-off was 29, making it the highest cut-off of any WTA tournament in the world in the past year.

Point distribution

Prize money

1Qualifiers prize money is also the Round of 32 prize money.
*per team

ATP singles main-draw entrants

Seeds 

1 Rankings as of January 2, 2017

Other entrants 
The following players received wildcards into the singles main draw:
  Alex de Minaur
  Thanasi Kokkinakis
  Jordan Thompson

The following players received entry from the qualifying draw:
  Matthew Barton
  Gastão Elias
  Thiago Monteiro
  Christopher O'Connell

The following players received entry by a lucky loser:
  Nikoloz Basilashvili
  Santiago Giraldo

Withdrawals 
Before the tournament
  Federico Delbonis → replaced by  Thomaz Bellucci
  Thanasi Kokkinakis (abdominal injury) → replaced by  Nikoloz Basilashvili
  Fernando Verdasco (fatigue) → replaced by  Santiago Giraldo

ATP doubles main-draw entrants

Seeds 

1 Rankings as of January 2, 2017

Other entrants 
The following pair received wildcard into the doubles main draw:
  Matt Reid /  Jordan Thompson

WTA singles main-draw entrants

Seeds 

1 Rankings as of January 2, 2017

Other entrants 
The following players received wildcards into the singles main draw:
  Belinda Bencic
  Eugenie Bouchard

The following players received entry from the qualifying draw:
  Kateryna Bondarenko
  Duan Yingying
  Christina McHale
  Maria Sakkari

The following players received entry by a lucky loser:
  Irina Falconi
  Arina Rodionova
  Donna Vekić

Withdrawals 
Before the tournament
  Caroline Garcia → replaced by  Monica Puig
  Petra Kvitová (off-court injury) → replaced by  Ekaterina Makarova
  Karolína Plíšková (left thigh injury) → replaced by  Irina Falconi
  Sloane Stephens (left foot injury) → replaced by  Arina Rodionova
  Carla Suárez Navarro → replaced by  Laura Siegemund
  Elina Svitolina (viral illness) → replaced by  Donna Vekić

WTA doubles main-draw entrants

Seeds 

1 Rankings as of January 2, 2017

Other entrants 
The following players received wildcards into the doubles main draw:
  Madison Brengle /  Arina Rodionova

Champions

Men's singles 

  Gilles Müller def.  Daniel Evans, 7–6(7–5), 6–2

Women's singles 

  Johanna Konta def.  Agnieszka Radwańska, 6–4, 6–2

Men's doubles 

   Wesley Koolhof /  Matwé Middelkoop def.  Jamie Murray /  Bruno Soares, 6–3, 7–5

Women's doubles 

  Tímea Babos /  Anastasia Pavlyuchenkova def.  Sania Mirza /  Barbora Strýcová, 6–4, 6–4

References

External links 
 Official website

 
Apia International Sydney, 2017